Zeyn ol Din (also Romanized as Zeyn ol Dīn, Zeyn Ad Dīn, and Zeyn od Dīn) is a village in Poshtdarband Rural District, in the Central District of Kermanshah County, Kermanshah Province, Iran. At the 2006 census, its population was 368, in 89 families.

References 

Populated places in Kermanshah County